The Sinks of Gandy — also called the Sinks of Gandy Creek, or simply "The Sinks" — are a modestly celebrated cave and underground stream at Osceola in eastern Randolph County, West Virginia, United States. The Sinks are on private property within the Monongahela National Forest.

Description
In some sections the stream occupies the entire floor of the passage, but in other sections it is confined to a narrow trench.

History

Gandy Creek — and thus the Sinks themselves — were named for Uriah Gandy (or Gandee) who settled in the area around 1781. Local settlers were certainly well aware of the Sinks by the 1830s. The earliest recorded reference to the Sinks may be a November 1833 letter sent by Randolph County physician Benjamin Dolbeare to the Virginia Historical and Philosophical Society in Richmond. Dolbeare described several local caves including one as follows (with original spellings).

"Between, what is here called, the Aleghany and Rich Mountains, heads a branch of the dry fork a tributary of Cheat River, a ridge extends itself quiet across, from one mountain to the other, and this branc[h], after keeping its course about 3 miles runs under this ridge which [is] about ¾ of mile wide at its base, and very high."

The Sinks were noted locally as the site of the last known killings of elk by hunters in what is now Randolph County, probably about 1830 and 1835. (The last elk killed in all of West Virginia were shot around 1843 in nearby Canaan Valley.)

In March 1864, a minor incident of the Civil War occurred at the Sinks. Eight men of General Imboden's Confederate command, who had been waylaying wagon trains in the north, crossed into neighboring Tucker County where they robbed a general store about 3 miles from the town of Saint George. They were pursued by a Union captain and lieutenant who closed on them the next day at the Sinks. Three rebels were killed in the ensuing shootout, two captured and the stolen property recovered.

The Sinks first came to widespread public notice by way of a tongue-in-cheek account of a pleasure expedition to the region published by David Hunter Strother in Harper's Magazine in 1872 and 1873, although the visit upon which it is based probably occurred around 1854. This story, entitled "The Mountains", details the high jinx of a group of lively "Virginia gentlemen" who bumble through the then-virgin forest, annoying the sullen local "mountaineers", in search of the "tunnel of Gandy". This semi-fictionalized narrative treated the locals in rather xenophobic terms and recounted a lurid tale of cattle rustling, abduction and desperate escape in the cave and the surrounding area.

The Sinks again became the object of a popularization effort when West Virginia writer Jack Preble published a series of articles and booklets about them between the 1940s and the 1960s. Preble's anecdotal and romanticizing approach was little more reliable than Strother's at giving an accurate account of the cave. It was also during this period that the West Virginia Highway Department began, with an eye toward the tourist potential, to replace the designation of "Osceola" with that of "The Sinks" on its official roadmaps.<ref>Preble, Jack, "Ibinthruthesinks Club", Pocahontas (W.Va.) Times, 19 Sept 1940 (Reprinted in Bulletin of the National Speleological Society, No. 3, pp 21-22).</ref>Preble, Jack, The Sinks of Gandy Creek, Parsons, West Virginia: McClain Printing Company, 1969 (26 page booklet).

This makes the Sinks the 669th longest surveyed cave in the U.S. as of 10 March 2014

Access
Both entrances to the Sinks are located on private land. The upstream entrance is owned by the Teter family and the downstream exit is owned by the Tingler family. (This same Teter family owned this land way back in 1854 when David Hunter Strother visited.) The location of the cave is not identified by any signage in the area.

The cave is relatively forgiving to inexperienced visitors. Because of its straightforward layout, most visitors can traverse it safely with simple household flashlights. A combination of scrambling and wading is required to pass some stretches, however, and many a visitor cannot locate the dry, downstream entrance (about  back and to the right from the wet stream exit) and is therefore compelled to return the way he came in.

References
Citations

Other sources
McGrew, Wes,  Netherworld News, September 1959.
Perry, Clay, "Come Let's Go Spelunking", Saturday Evening Post, pp. 14–15, 36, 38; 12 July 1941.
Sanford, Dick,  The Potomac Caver'', March 1969.

External links
Maps of the Sinks and environs at Speleogenesis website

Caves of West Virginia
Limestone caves
Landforms of Randolph County, West Virginia
Monongahela National Forest